Melissa Otero (born October 11, 1980) is an independent Puerto Rican pop/rock singer, artist, 
songwriter, and entrepreneur best known for her music licensing placements with her song "Angels and Demons" on Telemundo's Reina de corazones, Rock Band, and Lifetime TV's Dance Moms. Otero made her debut under her own label Divine Spell Music Group in late 2008.

Otero has released one album and one EP till this day. Her single "My First Everything" was released in mid-2006 and had international airplay on indie radio stations, marking the beginning of her professional career as an artist. It reached #1 for two consecutive weeks on the Hot97.net online radio. Her debut album My Spirit was released on Christmas Day in 2008 and has sold over 500 digital copies, mostly bought by people in Colombia and New York City.

In the spring of 2009, Otero went on theFree Spirit Tour which included performances in New York, Puerto Rico and throughout the Fox Valley in the State of Wisconsin.

The following winter, in addition to her touring, Otero began working on her second album titled /called "Angels and Demons" with Secret Sounds CEO/producer Stefan Moessle .

Early life 

Melissa Otero Cintrón was born in Elizabeth, New Jersey and grew up in the countryside of Yauco, Puerto Rico. She is the fourth child of Luis Otero, a retired mechanic, and Nellie Cintrón. When Otero was five years old, her family settled in Yauco where her parents bought a piece of land and decided to build their dream home.

After the house was complete, her father joined the National Guard and was sent to the mainland to begin boot camp while her mother struggled between work, school, and four kids. At the age of 9, Otero saw the Gloria Estefan Homecoming Concert as part of Estefan's Let It Loose Tour. She remarked to her mother: “When I grow up, I want to do that!” and soon after, Otero's dream of professionally pursuing music began.

As a child, Otero would create her own “home concerts” imitating Gloria Estefan and others. She struggled to find venues where she could perform live due to her choice to perform in English while she was, at the time, living in a Spanish-speaking country. She performed at many local talent shows. On several occasions, she won second place to later be told by the judges that she had not been awarded first place because of her choice to perform in English.

By the time Otero was close to 14, her mother decided to help her create a professional demo. A local recording studio called The Time Machine, run by Ivan Nazario, a well-respected producer in Puerto Rico, was opening in town and her mother immediately contacted them to inquire about pricing. She became their first customer but was unable to record there because the studio was not finished. They set out to San Juan, Puerto Rico and recorded at the Horizon Studios to record the covers “The Rose” by Bette Midler and “You Mean The World To Me” by Toni Braxton.

Once In A Lifetime Concert 1998 

During her final months in high school, Otero and her mother began working on her first concert ever in which she titled Once In A Lifetime. By 1995, American music became very popular and performing in English was not that much of a struggle anymore. The concert had many local businesses, schools and friends involved allowing Melissa to perform at the Starz Theater in Yauco, Puerto Rico. They sold over 300 tickets and was deemed a “huge success” for no other independent artist had been able to accomplish such an event while performing in another language.

Struggles with Mental Health 

During the summer of 2006, Melissa had released her single “My First Everything” but was struggling with depression. She did however continue writing and began her journey in writing 'My Spirit"

Angels and Demons 

During the months of July 2011 and August 2011, Melissa's new promotional track "Angels and Demons" was featured on US Airways as part of the Sonicbids Indie Showcase. The track was written by Otero and produced by Stefan Moessle.

Otero's song "Angels and Demons" was featured on Dance Moms during the Season 3 premier show on January 1, 2013. It was featured in the themed performance by the contestants.

Otero's song "Spellbound" was featured on Abby's Ultimate Dance Competition season 2 for Kalani Hilliker and Tyler Atwood duet "the ice queen".

"With You (Contigo)" was the official theme song for supporting characters Greta and Lazaro in the telenovela Reina de corazones (U.S. TV series)

"No Soy Un Angel" was the official love theme song for supporting characters Smith y el Supremo in the telenovela Reina de corazones (U.S. TV series)

Rock Band 

In c. 2012 "Angels and Demons" was part of the Rock Band (video game) catalog.

Discography

Extended Play (EP) studio albums
My First Everything (EP album) (2006)

Full Length (LP) studio albums
My Spirit (album) (2008)
Angels and Demons (album) (2013)
Erotomania (album) (2019) 
Antología (album) (2020)

Singles
Phantom of My Heart - Angel at Dawn Remix (single) (2010)
Angels and Demons (single) (2012)
Tu Corazón (single) (2012)
White Line Fever (single) (2013)
With You (Contigo) (single) (2014)
Stars (single) (2018)
Por Amor (single (2018)
Speak (single) (2019) 
Summertime Romance (single) (2020)

Compilation albums
Angels and Demons: The Remixes (2014)

See also 
Official Website
Facebook Page
Instagram Page

References 

PR Log Press Release

1980 births
Living people
People from Elizabeth, New Jersey
Puerto Rican singer-songwriters
People from Yauco, Puerto Rico
21st-century American singers